Saurabh and Sourabh are given names. Notable people with these names include:

Saurabh 
Saurabh Dube, Indian scholar in history, anthropology, archival and field research, subaltern studies, postcolonial perspectives
Saurabh Kalia (1976–1999), officer of the Indian army, died while being held as a prisoner of war by the Pakistani security forces
Saurabh Narain Singh (born 1975), member of the 3rd Vidhan Sabha of Jharkhand representing the Indian National Congress
Saurabh Shukla, Indian film and television actor, director and screenwriter
Saurabh Singh Shekhawat, Colonel in the Indian Army, mountaineer
Saurabh Tiwary (born 1989), Indian One Day International and first class cricketer
Saurabh Verma (born 1981), Indian-born American cricketer
Saurabh Kumar, Indian entrepreneur, co-founder of Grofers (later Blinkit)

Sourabh 

 Sourabh Goho (born 1991), Indian tabla player
 Sourabh Majumdar (born 1999), Indian cricketer
 Sourabh Raaj Jain (born 1985), Indian television actor and model
 Sourabh Verma (born 1992), Indian badminton player
 Sourabh Vij (born 1987), Indian shot putter

See also
Sarabbagh
Sharab (disambiguation)
Sharabha
Shurab (disambiguation)